Klaipėdos Nafta (KN) is an oil and LNG terminals operator based in Klaipėda, Lithuania. The company was founded in 1994. The company operates the Klaipėda Oil Terminal, Subačius oil terminal, Klaipėda LNG terminal, Açu LNG terminal (Brazil) and Klaipėda small-scale LNG reloading station.

Klaipėda Oil Terminal
The Klaipėda Oil Terminal was commissioned on 27 November 1959 and its exported fuel oil from Soviet oil refineries in Yaroslavl, Perm, and Ryazan. As of today, the main customer of the terminal is the ORLEN Lietuva oil refinery in Mažeikiai. The terminal serves also crude oil shipments to Belarus.

LNG terminal

Klaipėdos Nafta is an operator of the Lithuanian LNG terminal project. The consultant of the project was Fluor Corporation. The terminal was launched on December 3, 2014.

References

External links 
 

Oil companies of Lithuania
Oil terminals
Transport companies established in 1994
1994 establishments in Lithuania
Companies based in Klaipėda